Gishan may refer to the following places in Iran:

 Gishan-e Gharbi, Hormozgan Province
 Gishan, Hormozgan, Hormozgan Province
 Gishan, Sistan and Baluchestan, a location in Sistan and Baluchestan Province